Zabrus sublaevis is a species of black coloured ground beetle in the Pelor subgenus that is endemic to Ankara, Turkey.

References

Beetles described in 1836
Beetles of Europe
Endemic fauna of Turkey
Zabrus